The 1991 Eastern Michigan Eagles football team represented Eastern Michigan University in the 1991 NCAA Division I-A football season. In their ninth season under head coach Jim Harkema, the Eagles compiled a 3–7–1 record (3–4–1 against conference opponents), finished in seventh place in the Mid-American Conference, and were outscored by their opponents, 232 to 144. The team lost to two Big Ten Conference opponents, Purdue (3–49) and Wisconsin (6–21). The team's statistical leaders included Kwame McKinnon with 849 passing yards, Cameron Moss with 452 rushing yards, and Jon Pfeifer with 241 receiving yards.

Schedule

Personnel

References

Eastern Michigan
Eastern Michigan Eagles football seasons
Eastern Michigan Eagles football